Cool Spring Branch is a  long 1st order tributary to Lanes Creek in Union County, North Carolina.

Course
Cool Spring Branch rises about 3 miles southwest of Sturdivants Crossroads, North Carolina.  Cool Spring Branch then flows north to meet Lanes Creek about 0.5 miles northwest of Sturdivants Crossroads, North Carolina.

Watershed
Cool Spring Branch drains  of area, receives about 48.2 in/year of precipitation, has a topographic wetness index of 459.90 and is about 35% forested.

References

Rivers of North Carolina
Rivers of Union County, North Carolina
Tributaries of the Pee Dee River